Mutěnín is a municipality and village in Domažlice District in the Plzeň Region of the Czech Republic. It has about 300 inhabitants.

Administrative parts
Villages and hamlets of Erazim, Ostrov and Starý Kramolín are administrative parts of Mutěnín.

References

Villages in Domažlice District